The Toronto Branch Railway Line is a closed railway line in New South Wales, Australia. The line opened in 1891, and branched off the Main Northern line at Fassifern station, crossing over a single lane tunnel on Fassifern Road, and following the shore of Fennell Bay to Blackalls Park. The Toronto end of the line is located close to the shore of Toronto Bay.

Horse-drawn carriages were first to run along the branch line. A variety of steam engines also ran along the line during its operation, including a Coffee Pot engine, and the Prince of Wales travelled to Toronto by train on 24 June 1920.

Passenger services operated over the line, generally as a shuttle service between Fassifern and Toronto, but through services to Newcastle also operated. Services in 1989 were operated by 620/720 class diesel railcars, and operated as frequently as every 20 minutes. The line was not included in the Wyong–Newcastle electrification project, completed in 1984, which probably sealed its fate. It was controversially closed in 1990 despite local opposition, with a privately operated bus service replacing the train. Following the closure, a cycleway called the Toronto Greenway was constructed along the line. Most of the cycleway was constructed alongside the railway line in case the line is ever re-opened. The replacement bus service runs from Fassifern Station to Toronto Station, and includes a stop at Blackalls Park.

List of stations 
 Fassifern
 Blackalls Park
 Fennells Platform
 Bowers Platform
 Toronto

References

Closed regional railway lines in New South Wales
City of Lake Macquarie
Rail transport in the Hunter Region
Rail trails in Australia
Railway lines opened in 1891
Railway lines closed in 1990
Standard gauge railways in Australia